Avogadrite ((K,Cs)BF4) is a potassium-caesium tetrafluoroborate in the halide class. Avogadrite crystallizes in the orthorhombic system (space group Pnma) with cell parameters a 8.66 Å, b 5.48 Å and c Å 7.03.

History

The mineral was discovered by the Italian mineralogist Ferruccio Zambonini
in 1926. He analyzed several samples from the volcanic fumaroles close to Mount Vesuvius and from the Lipari islands. In nature, it can only be found as a sublimation product around volcanic fumaroles.  He named it after the Italian scientist Amedeo Avogadro (1776–1856).

See also
 Ferruccite, (NaBF4), the sodium tetrafluoroborate.

Bibliography
Palache, P.; Berman H.; Frondel, C. (1960). "Dana's System of Mineralogy, Volume II: Halides, Nitrates, Borates, Carbonates, Sulfates, Phosphates, Arsenates, Tungstates, Molybdates, Etc. (Seventh Edition)" John Wiley and Sons, Inc., New York, pp. 97-98.

References

Caesium minerals
Potassium minerals
Tetrafluoroborates
Orthorhombic minerals
Minerals in space group 62